Berthold Herbert Teusner CMG (16 May 1907 – 7 August 1992) was an Australian politician who represented the South Australian House of Assembly seat of Angas from 1944 to 1970 for the Liberal and Country League. He served as Speaker of the South Australian House of Assembly from 1956 to 1962.

References

 

1907 births
1992 deaths
Members of the South Australian House of Assembly
Liberal and Country League politicians
Speakers of the South Australian House of Assembly
People educated at Immanuel College, Adelaide